Hanging parrots are birds in the genus Loriculus, a group of small parrots from tropical southern Asia.

Often head coloring helps to identify individual species. They are unique among birds for their ability to sleep upside down.

Taxonomy
The genus Loriculus was introduced in 1849 by the English zoologist Edward Blyth for the blue-crowned hanging parrot. The name is a diminutive of the genus Lorius that was introduced by Nicholas Aylward Vigors for the lorys in 1825.

Fifteen species are recognised:
Vernal hanging parrot, Loriculus vernalis
Sri Lanka hanging parrot, Loriculus beryllinus
Philippine hanging parrot, Loriculus philippensis
Black-billed hanging parrot, Loriculus bonapartei
Camiguin hanging parrot, Loriculus camiguinensis (first described in 2006)
Blue-crowned hanging parrot, Loriculus galgulus
Great hanging parrot, Loriculus stigmatus (alsoknown as the Celebes hanging parrot)
Moluccan hanging parrot, Loriculus amabilis
Sula hanging parrot, Loriculus sclateri (split from L. amabilis)
Sangihe hanging parrot, Loriculus catamene
Orange-fronted hanging parrot, Loriculus aurantiifrons
Bismarck hanging parrot, Loriculus tener
Pygmy hanging parrot, Loriculus exilis (also known as the green hanging parrot)
Yellow-throated hanging parrot, Loriculus pusillus
Wallace's hanging parrot, Loriculus flosculus

See also
Parrotlet
Pygmy parrot
Fig parrot

References

 
Hanging
L
Taxa named by Edward Blyth